Hakan Turan (born 30 August 1992) is a Turkish footballer who plays as a midfielder for TFF Second League club Arnavutköy Belediyespor. He made his Süper Lig debut on 31 March 2012 against Gençlerbirliği.

References

External links
 
 

1992 births
People from Manisa
Living people
Turkish footballers
Association football midfielders
Manisaspor footballers
Nazilli Belediyespor footballers
Ankara Demirspor footballers
Turgutluspor footballers
Süper Lig players
TFF First League players
TFF Second League players